Petersville is an unincorporated community in Clinton County, in the U.S. state of Iowa.

History
Petersville was originally called Quigley. The present name honors John Peters and family, pioneer settlers. The town was platted as Petersville in 1902.

A post office was established under the name Quigley in 1883, and renamed Petersville in 1902; this post office closed in 1935.

Petersville's population was 55 in 1925.

References

Unincorporated communities in Clinton County, Iowa
1902 establishments in Iowa
Unincorporated communities in Iowa